is a former Japanese football player.

Playing career
Hirayama was born in Hamamatsu on January 9, 1978. After graduating from high school, he joined J1 League club Kashiwa Reysol with teammate Toru Irie in 1996. Although he was left side midfielder, he could hardly play in the match behind Tomohiro Katanosaka until early 1999. In August 1999, he became a regular player and the club won the champions 1999 J.League Cup. The club also won the 3rd place 1999 and 2000 J1 League. From 2004, although his opportunity to play decreased, he played many matches as substitute. However the club results were bad and was relegated to J2 League from 2006. In 2006, he played many matches as starting member and the club was promoted to J1 in a year. However he could hardly play in the match in 2007 and retired end of 2007 season.

Club statistics

References

External links

1978 births
Living people
Association football people from Shizuoka Prefecture
Japanese footballers
J1 League players
J2 League players
Kashiwa Reysol players
Association football midfielders